Doctor Peter Radtke (19 March 1943 – 28 November 2020) was a German actor and playwright who was the author of many scientific publications on disability issues and had a PhD in Romance languages. As a small boy his parents and a sympathetic doctor allowed him to escape a Nazi euthanasia program. From 1957 to 1961 Peter Radtke completed training as an interpreter of English, French and Spanish at a private foreign language school in Regensburg. In 1963 he studied at the University of Pennsylvania and acquired a "Certificate into American Culture and Civilization." Afterwards he studied at Regensburg and Geneva. He did drama and theater work before that. In 2003 he was appointed as a member of the national ethics advisory committee by resolution of the Federal Cabinet. Dr. Radtke received a service medal from Bavaria on 17 July 2003. He had osteogenesis imperfecta.

References

External links
German National Ethics Council page mentioning him 
Interview with Peter Radtke 
His website 

1943 births
2020 deaths
German male stage actors
German male film actors
German people with disabilities
People with osteogenesis imperfecta
Officers Crosses of the Order of Merit of the Federal Republic of Germany